Agonidium fuscicorne is a species of ground beetle in the subfamily Platyninae. It was described by Félix Édouard Guérin-Méneville in 1847.

References

fuscicorne
Beetles described in 1847